Tetsuya Takahashi (高橋 哲也 Takahashi Tetsuya) is a Japanese composer, arranger and singer.

Works

As composer 
 Appleseed (2004)
 House of Himiko (2005) - [Tracks: "Rainbow Soldier" and "Songs My Mother Taught Me"]
 Atagoal (2006 - CG adaptation)
 Appleseed Ex Machina (2007) - [CD2]
 Resident Evil: Degeneration (2008)
 Viper's Creed (2009)
 Marvel Anime (2010-2011)
 Dragon Age: Dawn of the Seeker (2012)
 Starship Troopers: Invasion (2012)
 Space Pirate Captain Harlock (2013)
 Pac-Man and the Ghostly Adventures (2013)
 Appleseed Alpha (2015)
 Marvel Future Avengers (2017-2018)
 Kemurikusa (2019)
 Saving 80,000 Gold in Another World for My Retirement (2023)

References 

Year of birth missing (living people)
Anime composers
Japanese film score composers
Japanese male film score composers
Japanese male singers
Japanese music arrangers
Living people
Musicians from Kanagawa Prefecture